The third edition of the Indian music television series Coke Studio India, titled as Coke Studio @ MTV, commenced airing on 17 August 2013 and concluded on 8 October 2013. The season returned with the previous year's format of multiple music composers producing their own songs. The season featured 13 music producers.

Artists

Producers 
 
 A. R. Rahman
 Aditya Balani
 Amit Trivedi
 Clinton Cerejo
 Func.
 Hitesh Sonik
 Orange Street
 Papon
 Ram Sampath
 Salim–Sulaiman
 Sonam Kalra
 Vijay Prakash
 Winit Tikoo

Featured Artists 
 
 A. R. Rahman
 Adi & Suhail
 Aditi Singh Sharma
 Aditya Bhasin
 Amit Trivedi
 Ani Choying Drolma
 Anirban Chakraborty
 Anwesha Datta Gupta
 Aruna Sairam
 Benny Dayal
 Bhanvari Devi
 Bianca Gomes
 Bismila Khan
 Clinton Cerejo
 Des Raj Lachkani (group)
 Dhruv Sangari
 Dulal Manki
 Faiz Mustafa
 Farah Siraj
 Gaurav Balani
 Hamsika Iyer
 Hans Raj Hans
 Hard Kaur
 Harshdeep Kaur
 Hasan Mustafa
 Imran Khan
 Jaggi
 Jonita Gandhi
 Kailash Kher
 Kalpana Patowary
 Karsan Sagathia
 Karthik
 Chandana Bala
 Kavita Seth
 Kutle Khan
 Mangey 'Manga' Khan (Barmer Boys)
 Munawar Masoom
 Murtuza Mustafa
 Nancy Aren Ao
 Nikhil D' Souza
 Papon
 Piyush Mishra
 Pt. Sanjeev Abhyankar
 Qadir Mustafa
 Rabbani Mustafa
 Rayhanah & Issrath
 Salim–Sulaiman
 Samantha Edwards
 Sanam Puri
 Shalmali Kholgade
 Shraddha Pandit
 Shruti Pathak
 Siddarth Basrur
 Simanta Shekhar
 Sona Mohapatra
 Sonam Kalra
 Sonu Kakkar
 Suchi & Blaaze
 Sukhwinder Singh
 Sunidhi Chauhan
 Tanvi Shah
 Tarun
 Tochi Raina
 Usri Banerjee
 Ustad Ghulam Mustafa Khan
 Ustad Rashid Khan
 Vijay Prakash
 Winit Tikoo

Episodes 
Coke Studio India 3 began airing on 1 August 2013 and concluded on 7 October 2013. The season featured 8 episodes, a total of 47 songs released in the span of three months.

Notes and references

Notes

References

External links 

 

Indian television series
2013 Indian television series debuts
Coke Studio (Indian TV program)